Mian  are Rajput clans of Jammu and Kashmir and Himachal Pradesh states in India.

The Mian Rajputs, are the clan, to which the rulers of Jammu & Kashmir and rulers of erstwhile princely states of Himachal Pradesh belong. 
They do not generally engage in trade or agriculture. They are major land owners and prefer to join cavalry or army by choice. The ruling family of Jamwal Rajput call themselves Mian Rajputs

References

Rajput clans
Social groups of Haryana
Social groups of Himachal Pradesh
Social groups of Jammu and Kashmir